Davorko Vidović (born 26 June 1956.) is a Croatian politician, the current president of Socijaldemokrati  and a member of Croatian Parliament. He also served as a Minister of Labour and Social Welfare from 2000 to 2003 and was elected a mayor of Sisak in 2005. In 2021, Vidović, along with several high ranking members of Social Democratic Party of Croatia including previous party leader Davor Bernardić were expelled from party on charges of doing damage to party or refusing to respect the decisions of the party. On July 9, 2022, they founded a new party named Socijaldemokrati

References 

21st-century Croatian politicians
People from Sisak
1956 births
Living people
Social Democratic Party of Croatia politicians
Government ministers of Croatia
Mayors of places in Croatia
Social Democrats of Croatia politicians